Vivi is a village in the Bas-Congo province of the Democratic Republic of the Congo. It is located on the north side of the Congo River, opposite the provincial capital of Matadi.

It was found in 1879 by Henry Morton Stanley. It served as the first capital of the Congo Free State from July, 1885 to May 1, 1886, when the capital was relocated to Boma.

References

Populated places in Kongo Central